Straight Point is a coastal region, forming a headland, between Exmouth and Budleigh Salterton in Devon on the south coast of England.

Location 

The top of the headland is used by the Royal Marines as a firing range. To the west is Sandy Bay, a holiday beach, that can be reached either along the coastal path or through the large caravan park. To the east are Otter Cove and Littleton Cove.

Geology 
The red sandstone cliffs at Straight Point show an interesting sequence of sandstones in the Exmouth Formation. Most of the western section is accessible at low tide from Sandy Bay. Only a small part of the eastern side is accessible at low tide. Predominantly the cliffs are composed of layers of "Aylesbeare Mudstone", but additionally with these sandstone Layers. These rock formations are important because they represent the earliest geology along the entire coast. They are from the Triassic period and date from 250 million years ago. Both sediments are markedly red, which indicates that they were formed in a desert.

References 

Bays of Devon
Jurassic Coast
Geology of Devon